"Be Someone Else" is a song by Slimmy, released in 2010 as the lead single from his second studio album Be Someone Else. The single wasn't particularly successful, charting anywhere.
A music video was also made for "Be Someone Else", produced by Riot Films. It premiered on 27 June 2010 on YouTube.

Background
"Be Someone Else" was unveiled as the album's lead single. The song was written by Fernandes and produced by Quico Serrano and Mark J Turner. It was released to MySpace on 1 January 2010.

Music video
A music video was also made for "Be Someone Else", produced by Riot Films. It premiered on 27 June 2010 on YouTube. The music video features two different scenes which alternate with each other many times during the video. The first scene features Slimmy performing the song with an electric guitar and the second scene features Slimmy performing with the band in the background.

Chart performance
The single wasn't particularly successful, charting anywhere.

Live performances
 A Very Slimmy Tour
 Be Someone Else Tour

Track listing

Digital single
"Be Someone Else" (album version) - 3:22

Personnel
Taken from the album's booklet.

Paulo Fernandes – main vocals, guitar
Paulo Garim – bass
Tó-Zé – drums

Release history

Charts

References

External links
Official music video at YouTube.

2010 singles
English-language Portuguese songs
2009 songs